Domingo Colín (born 4 August 1952) is a Mexican former racewalker who competed in the 1976 Summer Olympics and in the 1980 Summer Olympics.

References

External links
 

1952 births
Living people
Mexican male racewalkers
Olympic athletes of Mexico
Athletes (track and field) at the 1976 Summer Olympics
Athletes (track and field) at the 1980 Summer Olympics
Pan American Games medalists in athletics (track and field)
Pan American Games silver medalists for Mexico
Athletes (track and field) at the 1975 Pan American Games
Medalists at the 1975 Pan American Games
20th-century Mexican people